Cape Clarence Wyckoff, also known as Cape Wyckoff, is a broad headland in the Wandel Sea, Arctic Ocean, northernmost Greenland. Administratively it is part of the Northeast Greenland National Park.

History
In 1900 Peary explored the north coast of Greenland from Cape Washington in the west to a place he named Wyckoff Island in the east, on the way reaching Cape Morris Jesup, the northernmost point of mainland Greenland. Cape Wyckoff was visible in the distance and was named by Robert Peary after Clarence F. Wyckoff, one of the members of the Peary Arctic Club in New York.

This headland was marked on Robert Peary's map of the eastern coast of North Greenland as guesswork, based on sighting of two headlands from Wyckoff Land, for the visibility was marred by fog. Cape Clarence Wyckoff was finally charted with accuracy by J.P. Koch during the 1906-07 Danmark Expedition.

Geography
A small bay lies on the western side, on the right shore of Hellefisk Fjord, and Wyckoff Land lies beyond this bay, about 9 km to the northwest.

References

External links
 Clarence Wyckoff North Pole journey

Wyckoff
Peary Land